Jonathan Greenfield (born 18 February 1982) is a South African soccer player.

Career

Club
Born in Cape Town, Greenfield began his career in his native South Africa, playing professionally for Cape Town-based team Vasco da Gama in 2000, and then for Mamelodi Sundowns in the South African Premier Soccer League from 2000 to 2003.

Greenfield moved to the United States in 2004, and has since divided his time playing both outdoor and indoor soccer, for Milwaukee Wave United and Minnesota Thunder in the USL First Division, and for Milwaukee Wave, Detroit Ignition and Baltimore Blast in the Major Indoor Soccer League and the National Indoor Soccer League.

Greenfield won the 2009 NISL Championship with Baltimore, defeating Rockford Rampage 13–10 in the Championship Game.

International
Greenfield represented South Africa internationally at U-23 level, but has never played for the senior South African team.

Honors

Rochester Rhinos
USSF Division 2 Pro League Regular Season Champions (1): 2010

References

External links
Minnesota Thunder bio
Baltimore Blast bio

1982 births
Living people
South African people of British descent
Baltimore Blast (2008–2014 MISL) players
Detroit Ignition players
Expatriate soccer players in the United States
Association football defenders
Major Indoor Soccer League (2001–2008) players
Milwaukee Wave players
Milwaukee Wave United players
Minnesota Thunder players
Sportspeople from Cape Town
Rochester New York FC players
San Antonio Scorpions players
North Carolina FC players
South African expatriate soccer players
South African soccer players
USL First Division players
White South African people
Mamelodi Sundowns F.C. players
USSF Division 2 Professional League players
North American Soccer League players
Major Indoor Soccer League (2008–2014) players
Player-coaches
American beach soccer players
Detroit Ignition (MISL) players
South African expatriate sportspeople in the United States
Major Arena Soccer League coaches